Archduchess Maria Theresa of Austria-Este (14 July 1817, Modena, Duchy of Modena and Reggio – 25 March 1886, Gorizia, Austria-Hungary) was a member of the House of Austria-Este and Archduchess of Austria, Princess of Hungary, Bohemia, and Modena by birth. Henri was disputedly King of France and Navarre from 2 to 9 August 1830 and afterwards the Legitimist pretender to the throne of France from 1844 to 1883. Maria Theresa was the eldest child of Francis IV, Duke of Modena and his niece-wife Maria Beatrice of Savoy.

Biography
Maria Theresa married Henri, comte de Chambord, the posthumous son of Charles Ferdinand, Duke of Berry, younger son of Charles X of France, by his wife, Princess Caroline Ferdinande of Bourbon-Two Sicilies, daughter of Francis I of the Two Sicilies, by proxy on 7 November 1846 in Modena and in person on 16 November 1846 in Bruck an der Mur. Maria Theresa and Henri produced no children.
Maria Theresa had been chosen as Henri's wife by his paternal aunt Marie-Thérèse-Charlotte of France. Marie-Thérèse sought to ally the exiled French Royal Family with the House of Austria-Este for several reasons: it was Roman Catholic and the only royal family not to have recognized the July Monarchy of Louis-Philippe of France. Henri had actually preferred Maria Theresa's youngest sister, Maria Beatrix.

After Henri's death on 24 August 1883, Maria Theresa and a minority of Henri's supporters held that Juan, Count of Montizón, as senior male descendant of Louis XIV, was his successor. Juan's wife was Maria Theresa's sister, Maria Beatrix.

Maria Theresa was instrumental in building a crypt for the French Royal Family at the Church of the Annunciation of Our Lady on Castagnevizza in Görz (now in Nova Gorica, Slovenia). It was her wish that the last of the Bourbons be gathered in one place together within the monastery at Castagnevizza. Three years after the death of her husband Henri, Maria Theresa died on 25 March 1886 in Görz and was interred with her husband in the crypt of the church of Franciscan Monastery of Castagnevizza in Görz.

Honours
  : Dame of the Order of the Starry Cross

Gallery

Ancestry

References

|-

1817 births
1886 deaths
Austria-Este
Austrian princesses
Modenese princesses
Princesses of France (Bourbon)
Burials at Kostanjevica Monastery
Daughters of monarchs